Yacoub Aly Abeid (born 11 December 1997) is a Mauritanian footballer who plays for Liga I club UTA Arad and the Mauritanian national football team as a left-back.

Club career
Aly Abeid and compatriot Moctar Sidi El Hacen were signed by Spanish club Levante UD in 2014 after impressing in a nearby tournament, but could not play competitively for the team until the age of 18 due to FIFA regulations. He began to play for the reserve team in Segunda División B and Tercera División.

On 15 April 2018 among a crisis of injuries and suspensions in the Valencian club, Aly Abeid made his debut as a starter for the first team in La Liga, in a 3–0 loss at Atlético Madrid. He was praised by Marca for his performance. Aly Abeid was loaned to AD Alcorcón of Segunda División on 16 July 2018 for a season, and was registered with their second team in the fourth tier.

On 23 January 2020, Abeid officially joined French Ligue 2 club Valenciennes FC, signing a deal until June 2022.

On 29 June 2022, Abeid signed with UTA Arad in Romania.

International career
He played for the national team at the African Cup of Nations 2019, the first international tournament of the team

International stats

Scores and results list Mauritania's goal tally first.

References

External links 
 
 
 
 

1997 births
Living people
Mauritanian footballers
Mauritanian expatriate footballers
Mauritania international footballers
Association football defenders
La Liga players
Segunda División players
Segunda División B players
Ligue 2 players
Championnat National 3 players
Atlético Levante UD players
Levante UD footballers
AD Alcorcón B players
AD Alcorcón footballers
Valenciennes FC players
FC UTA Arad players
Expatriate footballers in Spain
Expatriate footballers in France
Expatriate footballers in Romania
Mauritanian expatriate sportspeople in Spain
Mauritanian expatriate sportspeople in France
Mauritanian expatriate sportspeople in Romania
2019 Africa Cup of Nations players
2021 Africa Cup of Nations players